Rud Moshk (also Romanized as Rūd Moshk, Rood Moshk, Rūd-e Moshk, and Rūdmeshk; also known as Rūdi Mushk, Rūd Moshg, and Meshk) is a village in Rud Ab-e Gharbi Rural District, Rud Ab District, Narmashir County, Kerman Province, Iran. At the 2006 census, its population was 197, in 45 families.

References 

Populated places in Narmashir County